Tomstown may refer to:

Tomstown, Ontario
Tomstown, Pennsylvania